Parasa chloris, the smaller parasa, is a species of slug caterpillar moth in the family Limacodidae.

The MONA or Hodges number for Parasa chloris is 4698.

Subspecies
These two subspecies belong to the species Parasa chloris:
 Parasa chloris chloris (Herrich-Schäffer, 1854)
 Parasa chloris huachuca Dyar, 1905

References

Further reading

External links

 

Limacodidae
Articles created by Qbugbot
Moths described in 1854